The 2015–16 SAFA Second Division (known as the ABC Motsepe League for sponsorship reasons) was the 18th season of the SAFA Second Division, the third tier league for South African association football clubs, since its establishment in 1998. Due to the size of South Africa, the competition is split into nine divisions, one for each region. After the league stage of the regional competition has completed, the nine teams are placed into two 'streams', sometimes referred to as the Inland and Coastal streams.

The teams that finish in first place of the stream stage are promoted to the National First Division. They, then compete for an overall title with a substantial prize fund.

Regions

Eastern Cape

Free State

Gauteng

Kwazulu-Natal

Limpopo

Mpumalanga

Northern Cape

Stream A

Stream B

North-West

Western Cape

National play-offs

Group A

Group B

Championship

Magesi were awarded a cheque of R1 million for winning the tournament.

References 

SAFA Second Division seasons
3